Angelique Hristodoulou (born 17 September 2001) is a professional Australian soccer player who currently plays for Western Sydney Wanderers in the A-League Women. She previously played for Sydney FC and has represented Australia with the under-17 and under-20 national teams.

Club career

Western Sydney Wanderers, 2016–2017 
On 4 November 2016, Hristodoulou joined the Western Sydney Wanderers at the age of 15, making eight appearances for the club.

Sydney FC, 2017–2022 
Hristodoulou signed with Sydney FC for the 2017–18 W-League season. She made her debut during the team's 3–2 win over previous-season champions Melbourne City FC.

Western Sydney Wanderers, 2022– 
In October 2022, Hristodoulou returned to Western Sydney Wanderers, signing a two-year contract.

International career

Australia U-17 
Hristodoulou captained the Australia's under-17 national team squad at the 2017 AFC U-16 Women's Championship. She made six appearances and scored one goal at this tournament.

Personal life
Hristodoulou's father, Eric Hristodoulou, played for Sydney Olympic in the former National Soccer League.

Honours

Club
 W-League Championship: 2018–19
 W-League Premiership: 2020–21, 2022–22`

Individual
 Sydney FC Women's U-20 Player of the Year: 2019–20

References

External links 
 Sydney FC player profile
 Angelique Hristodoulou on Soccerway

2001 births
A-League Women players
Living people
Sydney FC (A-League Women) players
Western Sydney Wanderers FC (A-League Women) players
Australian women's soccer players
Women's association football midfielders
Australian people of Greek descent